The fifth series of China's Got Talent, sponsored by Škoda Auto, premiered on DragonTV on December 8, 2013. Judges were Zhao Wei, Alec Su, Liu Ye and Wang Wei-chung.

References
 Official site

2013 Chinese television seasons
China's Got Talent